Khaldoun Asfour is an Australian politician currently serving as the Mayor of the City of Canterbury-Bankstown, the largest local government area in New South Wales by population, and fourth most-populous local government in Australia. He previously served as a councillor for the City of Bankstown from 2004 to 2016, serving as its mayor from 2011 to 2014 and again from 2015 to 2016.

Career

Asfour is a member of the Australian Labor Party, and publicly announced his intention to nominate as the party's endorsed candidate for the New South Wales state seat of Lakemba for the 2015 New South Wales state election. He was not successful, with the party choosing eventual MP Jihad Dib without a local pre-selection contest taking place.

In 2018, Asfour announced that the City of Canterbury-Bankstown would establish a pilot program to provide free childcare to all local asylum seeker families in its council-run centres, the first program of its kind in Australia.

In 2022, Asfour was accused of being an acolyte for corrupt politician Eddie Obeid by fellow Labour MP Tania Mihailuk in State Parliament. Following the claims, Asfour was investigated by an independent party and was subsequently cleared of any wrongdoing in January 2023.

References 

Living people
Mayors of Bankstown
Deputy mayors of places in Australia
Year of birth missing (living people)